The Central District of Borujen County is in Chaharmahal and Bakhtiari province, Iran. At the 2006 census, its population was 77,884 in 19,489 households. The following census in 2011 counted 82,225 people in 22,708 households. At the latest census in 2016, the district had 86,915 inhabitants living in 25,722 households.

References 

Borujen County

Districts of Chaharmahal and Bakhtiari Province

Populated places in Chaharmahal and Bakhtiari Province

Populated places in Borujen County